Yu Yifeng (born 6 June 1963) is a Chinese fencer. He competed in the individual and team foil events at the 1984 Summer Olympics.

References

External links
 

1963 births
Living people
Chinese male foil fencers
Olympic fencers of China
Fencers at the 1984 Summer Olympics
Asian Games medalists in fencing
Fencers at the 1986 Asian Games
Asian Games silver medalists for China
Medalists at the 1986 Asian Games
21st-century Chinese people
20th-century Chinese people